Phelypaea is a genus of flowering plants in the broomrape family Orobanchaceae, native to the Balkans, Greece, Crimea, the Caucasus region, Anatolia, the Levant, Iraq and Iran. They are root parasites which cannot conduct photosynthesis and are only seen above ground when flowering.

Species
Currently accepted species include:

Phelypaea boissieri (Reut.) Stapf
Phelypaea coccinea (M.Bieb.) Poir.
Phelypaea tournefortii Desf.

References

Orobanchaceae
Orobanchaceae genera